Two-time defending champion Esther Vergeer defeated Florence Gravellier in the final, 6–3, 6–1 to win the women's singles wheelchair tennis title at the 2007 US Open.

Seeds

 Esther Vergeer (champion)
 Sharon Walraven (semifinals)

Draw

Finals

External links

PDF Draw

Wheelchair Women's Singles
U.S. Open, 2007 Women's Singles